Amblyseius impeltatus is a species of mite in the family Phytoseiidae.

References

impeltatus
Articles created by Qbugbot
Animals described in 1973